Chet Nichols may refer to:

Chet Nichols Sr. (1897–1982), pitcher in major league baseball from 1926 to 1932, the father of Chet Nichols, Jr.
Chet Nichols Jr. (1931–1995), pitcher in major league baseball from 1951 to 1964